Greenway or Greenways may refer to:
 Greenway (landscape), a linear park focused on a trail or bike path
 Another term for bicycle boulevards in some jurisdictions

People
 Greenway (surname)

Places

Australia
 Electoral Division of Greenway, NSW, Australia
 Greenway, Australian Capital Territory
Greenways, South Australia, a town

Canada
 Greenway, Manitoba
 Greenway Sound and Greenway Point, British Columbia
 Greenway, Ontario

Ireland
Boyne Greenway, cycle and walkway, Co. Meath
Dublin-Galway Greenway, cycle and walkway
Great Western Greenway, cycle and walkway, Co. Mayo
Waterford Greenway, cycle and walkway between Waterford and Dungarvan

United Kingdom
 Greenway, several places in England
 Greenway footpath, London
 Greenway, Pembrokeshire, a hamlet in the Preseli Hills
 Greenway Estate, Devon, former house of Agatha Christie
 Greenway Halt railway station (Devon)

United States
 Greenway (Washington, D.C.), a neighborhood
 Central Florida GreeneWay, roadway around Orlando, Florida
 Dulles Greenway, tollway in Virginia
 East Coast Greenway project, linking Atlantic coast cities
 Greater Grand Forks Greenway, park
 Greenway, Arkansas, small town
 Greenway, South Dakota, unincorporated community in McPherson County
 Greenway (Madison Mills, Virginia), a historic house and farm
 Greenway Court, Virginia, National Historic Landmark, Virginia
 Greenway Plantation, Virginia
 Greenway Township, Minnesota, small town
 Manhattan Waterfront Greenway
 Maryville Alcoa Greenway, foot and cycle path in Tennessee 
 Midtown Greenway, Minneapolis, Minnesota
 Mountains to Sound Greenway, Washington
 Niagara River Greenway Plan
 Rachel Carson Greenway, Montgomery County, Maryland
 Rose Fitzgerald Kennedy Greenway, linear park in Boston

Art, entertainment, and media
 Green Ways (John Ireland) (or Greenways), 1937 piano pieces

Other uses
 East Lancs Greenway, British single-deck bus
 Greenways School, a former English prep school

See also
 Greenaway (disambiguation)